National Women's Party of Turkey (TUKP for short) was a former Turkish political party.

It was founded on 17 November 1972 by Mübeccel Göktuna Törüner in İstanbul. Although Turkish women gained universal suffrage in 1934, in the 1970s women's participation in Turkish politics was very low. For example, in the 1969 elections only 5 women MPs were elected to the 450-seat lower house of the  parliament. Thus the goal of the party was to increase women's participation in politics.

However the party faced with legal barriers. In order to enter the elections, the party had to form branch offices in at least 15 provinces which the party failed to achieve. Before they were able to fulfill the legal requirements to enter the election however, the activities of all Turkish parties were suspended as a result of the 1980 Turkish coup d'état. On 16 September 1981 the party (like all other parties) was closed by the military rule. Unlike main parties, the National Women's party was not revived after Turkey returned to civilian democracy in 1983. In June 2014, however, women's rights activists (led by Benal Yazgan) submitted a petition to the Interior Ministry for a new Woman Party (Kadın Partisi) to be formally registered as a political party.

See also
 Women in Turkish politics

References

Defunct political parties in Turkey
Political parties established in 1972
Political parties disestablished in 1981
1972 establishments in Turkey
1981 disestablishments in Turkey
Turkish women in politics
Feminist parties in Turkey